The East London Central Synagogue is an Ashkenazi purpose-built synagogue (shul) on Nelson Street in London's East End, the area immediately to the east of the City of London. When founded in 1923, its name was the Nelson Street Sfardish Synagogue. It has "an unassuming exterior and a stunningly beautiful interior".

History
In the early twentieth century, the East End was a new centre of Jewish life in England: in the compact area there was a population of around 250,000 Jews. Mostly they were Yiddish-speaking first-generation immigrants from Eastern Europe, unlike the established Ashkenazi and Sephardi communities in Britain, which in the main had come from the Low Countries. Serving this community were about 150 synagogues. As a consequence of the Second World War, which saw the East End heavily bombed, this population moved on to new Jewish centres in North and Northwest London such as those in Stamford Hill, Golders Green and Hendon, and the congregations of the East End synagogues consolidated. Just three synagogues now remain in the area, the Nelson Street Synagogue the only one purpose-built. About twenty neighbouring synagogues were amalgamated with it over the years, including: Belz, Berditchever, Buross Street, Cannon Street Road, Chevra Shas, Commercial Road Great, Grove Street, Jubilee Street, Mile End, New Road, Philpot Street Great, Philpot Street Sphardish, Rumanian Sidney Street, and Sons of Britchan (B'nai Brichtan). As a consequence of these amalgamations the shul has a large collection of Torah scrolls, some dating back to the 18th century, many of now unknown origin.

Architecture
In his second volume on London, published in 1951, the architectural historian Sir Nikolaus Pevsner recorded that the synagogue was built by Lewis Solomon and Son, and described it thus: "Discreet brick exterior with two tiers of windows beneath round-headed arches with stone keystones. Fine classical interior. Galleries with iron railings between Ionic columns; coved steps, framed by a Venetian arch on Doric columns. Above the Ark, scrolled pediment with tablets of the law and Lions of Judah. Panelled pews and Bimah".

Lewis Solomon (1848–1928) had built several synagogues, and served as both the Federation of Synagogues' Honorary Architect and also the United Synagogue's Architect and Surveyor. By 1923 his practice was being run by his son Digby Lewis Solomon (1884–1962). Lewis Solomon and Son had, two years earlier, redesigned the premises occupied by the neighbouring Congregation of Jacob synagogue on Commercial Road, which also still survives.

Modern existence
The shul belongs to the Orthodox Federation of Synagogues. The term "Sfardish" in the original name indicates that the shul, while Ashkenazi, follows Nusach Sefard, a prayer liturgy influenced by the Rabbi Isaac Luria's attempts to reconcile the Ashkenazi and Sephardi liturgies.

The East End now has a very considerable Muslim population, with which the shul actively maintains interfaith relations through the Tower Hamlets Inter Faith Forum, of which the large East London Mosque on Whitechapel Road is also a member. The building is also regularly visited by historical societies and walking tours, and has in the past participated in Open House London.

The architect Maxwell Hutchinson has drawn up a plan for adding museum and library space, so that the shul could increase its standing as a tourist destination and allow it to become a historic Jewish centre. Funding for this plan is in the process of being sought.

In January 2018 there was a march to the synagogue from Aldgate to commemorate the East End's Jewish heritage, followed by a multi-faith service of remembrance in which the Deputy Mayor of Tower Hamlets took part.

References

External links 
Nelson Street Shul - official website

Ashkenazi Jewish culture in London
Ashkenazi synagogues
Synagogues in London
Jewish organizations established in 1923
1923 establishments in England
Synagogues completed in 1923
Orthodox synagogues in England
Polish-Jewish culture in the United Kingdom
Russian-Jewish diaspora in Europe
Yiddish culture in England